What Have We Learned, Charlie Brown? A Tribute is the 26th prime-time animated television special based upon the comic strip Peanuts, by Charles M. Schulz, who introduced the special. It originally aired on the CBS network on May 30, 1983, Memorial Day in the United States, and one week prior to the 39th anniversary of the D-Day Invasion. It was rebroadcast on CBS on May 26, 1984 and again on May 29, 1989.

Production
The special directly follows the events of the 1980 theatrical feature film Bon Voyage, Charlie Brown (and Don't Come Back!!). Charlie Brown, Linus, Snoopy, Peppermint Patty, Marcie, and Woodstock are returning from their student exchange in Paris. The film was purposefully open-ended in case there could be other adventures among the characters prior to returning home.

Charles Schulz said about its development,

Schulz struggled with development of the storyline until shortly after his open-heart surgery in 1981. While recuperating, he was able to finalize the concept with a common line that would tie everything together, "What Have We Learned, Charlie Brown?"

Plot 
The special opens with Charlie Brown at home and he takes a book from his shelf titled "My Trip". His younger sister, Sally, approaches and asks him what he's doing. Charlie Brown tells her that he's making a photo album with pictures he took in France when he, Linus, Peppermint Patty, Marcie, Snoopy, and Woodstock went there for a student exchange. Sally realizes that Charlie Brown never told her what happened after the fire in the chateau and how he got home and asks if he learned anything. From there, it is shown in a flashback:

As they begin to head back from the chateau to the train station for the return trip to London (where they would return to America by plane), their problematic rental car (a Citroen 2CV) slows their progress, before breaking down entirely in a small French town. Renting another one from a French lady (who immediately accepts their offer after realizing Snoopy is, in fact, a World War I Flying Ace) they soon become lost and camp at a nearby beach for the night. Linus, however, wakes up shortly before daybreak and walks along the beach, realizing they are at Omaha Beach.

Linus then tells of the battle of D-Day, leading the group to the nearby cemetery for all of the American soldiers. The voice of General Dwight D. Eisenhower is also heard, reminiscing about the experiences of the battle. Archival news footage is also used, in some cases with the characters inserted through rotoscoping.

While proceeding up north, they head towards Ypres, which Linus recognized as the site of a series of battles during World War I. They arrive at a field of red poppies, which grew throughout the wastelands of battles fought during the war, and which serves as a marker for the Ypres battle site. Linus then recites John McCrae's famous poem In Flanders Fields, after directing the group to the British field dressing station where McCrae was inspired to write the poem.

They come away realizing what the impact of the wars were, and how important the sacrifice of the soldiers was. Standing among the field of red poppies, Linus then turns and asks, "What have we learned, Charlie Brown?". The scene flashes back to him and Sally. She then tells him that he is pasting the pictures upside down.

Voice cast
 Brad Kesten as Charlie Brown
 Jeremy Schoenberg as Linus van Pelt
 Stacy Heather Tolkin as Sally Brown
 Brent Hauer/Victoria Vargas as Peppermint Patty
 Michael Dockery as Marcie
 Monica Parker as French Lady
 Bill Melendez as Snoopy and Woodstock

Award
The special won a Peabody Award for "distinguished achievement and meritorious public service" in broadcasting. Schulz would later say of the acclaim,

Home media
The special was released on VHS by Kartes Video Communications in 1987 and again by Paramount on June 25, 1996. The special is available for purchase on iTunes together with You're Not Elected, Charlie Brown and He's a Bully, Charlie Brown, and is now available on DVD in the Peanuts Emmy Honored Collection.

References

External links
 

Peanuts television specials
Peabody Award-winning broadcasts
Television shows directed by Bill Melendez
1980s American television specials
1980s animated television specials
1980s American animated films
1983 television specials
1983 in American television
CBS television specials
CBS original programming
Television shows written by Charles M. Schulz
American sequel films